Casimir III the Great (30 April 1310 – 5 November 1370) reigned as the King of Poland from 1333 to 1370. He also later became King of Ruthenia in 1340, and fought to retain the title in the Galicia-Volhynia Wars. He was the last Polish king from the Piast dynasty.

Casimir inherited a kingdom weakened by war and made it prosperous and wealthy. He reformed the Polish army and doubled the size of the kingdom. He reformed the judicial system and introduced a legal code, gaining the title "the Polish Justinian". Casimir built extensively and founded the Jagiellonian University (back then simply called the University of Krakow), the oldest Polish university and one of the oldest in the world. He also confirmed privileges and protections previously granted to Jews and encouraged them to settle in Poland in great numbers.

Casimir left no legitimate sons. When he died in 1370 from an injury received while hunting, his nephew, King Louis I of Hungary, succeeded him as king of Poland in personal union with Hungary.

The Great King

Casimir was born on 30 April 1310 in Kowal, Kuyavia, the third son of Ladislaus the Short and Jadwiga of Kalisz. He had two brothers who died in infancy and three sisters: Kunegunda, Elżbieta, and Jadwiga. When Casimir attained the throne in 1333, his position was in danger, as his neighbours did not recognise his title and instead called him "king of Kraków". The kingdom was depopulated and exhausted by war, and the economy was ruined. In 1335, in the Treaty of Trentschin, Casimir was forced to relinquish his claims to Silesia "in perpetuity".

Casimir began to rebuild the country and strengthen its defenses. During his reign, nearly 30 towns were supplied with fortification walls and some 50 castles were constructed, including castles along the Trail of the Eagle's Nests. These achievements are still celebrated today, in a commonly-known ditty that translates as follows: inherited wooden towns and left them fortified with stone and brick (Kazimierz Wielki zastał Polskę drewnianą, a zostawił murowaną).

He organized a meeting of kings in Kraków in 1364 at which he exhibited the wealth of the Polish kingdom. Casimir is the only king in Polish history to both receive and retain the title of "Great", as Bolesław I is more commonly known as "the Brave".

Reforms 
Casimir ensured stability and great prospects for the future of the country. He established the Corona Regni Poloniae – the Crown of the Polish Kingdom, which certified the existence of the Polish lands independently from the monarch. Prior to that, the lands were only the property of the Piast dynasty.

At the Sejm in Wiślica, on 11 March 1347, Casimir introduced reforms to the Polish judicial system and sanctioned civil and criminal codes for Great and Lesser Poland, earning the title "the Polish Justinian". In 1364, having received permission from Pope Urban V, Casimir established the University of Kraków, now the oldest university in Poland. It was regarded as a rare distinction, since it was only the second university founded in Central Europe, after the Charles University in Prague.

Politics and Expansion 
Casimir demonstrated competence in foreign diplomacy and managed to double the size of his kingdom. He neutralized relations with potential enemies to the west and north, and began to expand his territory eastward. He conquered the Ruthenian kingdom of Halych and Volodymyr (a territory in the modern-day Ukraine), known in Polish history as Red Ruthenia and Volhynia. By extending the borders far south-east, the Polish kingdom gained access to the lucrative Black Sea trade.

Succession
In 1355, in Buda, Casimir designated his nephew Louis I of Hungary as his successor should he produce no male heir, just as his father had with Charles I of Hungary to gain help against Bohemia. In exchange Casimir gained a favourable Hungarian attitude, needed in disputes with the hostile Teutonic Order and the Kingdom of Bohemia. At the time Casimir was 45 years old, and so producing a son did not seem unreasonable.

Casimir left no legal son, however, begetting five daughters instead. He tried to adopt his grandson, Casimir IV, Duke of Pomerania, in his last will. The child had been born to his eldest daughter, Elisabeth, Duchess of Pomerania, in 1351. This part of the testament was invalidated by Louis I of Hungary, however, who had traveled to Kraków quickly after Casimir died (in 1370) and bribed the nobles with future privileges. Casimir III also had a son-in-law, Louis VI of Bavaria, Margrave and Prince-elector of Brandenburg, who was considered a possible successor, but he was deemed ineligible as his wife, Casimir's daughter Cunigunde, had died in 1357 without issue.
 
Thus King Louis I of Hungary became successor in Poland. Louis was proclaimed king upon Casimir's death in 1370, though Casimir's sister Elisabeth (Louis's mother) held much of the real power until her death in 1380.

Society under the reign of Casimir

Casimir was facetiously named "the Peasants' King". He introduced the codes of law of Greater and Lesser Poland as an attempt to end the overwhelming superiority of the nobility. During his reign all three major classes — the nobility, priesthood, and bourgeoisie — were more or less counterbalanced, allowing Casimir to strengthen his monarchic position. He was known for siding with the weak when the law did not protect them from nobles and clergymen. He reportedly even supported a peasant whose house had been demolished by his own mistress, after she had ordered it to be pulled down because it disturbed her enjoyment of the beautiful landscape.

His popularity with the peasants helped to rebuild the country, as part of the reconstruction program was funded by a land tax paid by the lower social class.

Relationship with Jews

On 9 October 1334, Casimir confirmed the privileges granted to Jews in 1264 by Bolesław V the Chaste. Under penalty of death, he prohibited the kidnapping of Jewish children for the purpose of enforced Christian baptism, and he inflicted heavy punishment for the desecration of Jewish cemeteries. While Jews had lived in Poland since before his reign, Casimir allowed them to settle in Poland in great numbers and protected them as people of the king. About 70 percent of the world's European Jews, or Ashkenazi, can trace their ancestry to Poland due to Casimir’s reforms. Casimir's legendary Jewish mistress Esterka remains unconfirmed by direct historical evidence.

Relationships and children
Casimir III was married four times:

Aldona of Lithuania
On 30 April or 16 October 1325, Casimir married Aldona of Lithuania, daughter of Grand Duke Gediminas of Lithuania and Jewna. They had:
Elisabeth of Poland (ca. 1326–1361); married Duke Bogislaus V of Pomerania
Cunigunde of Poland (1334–1357), married Louis VI the Roman, the son of Louis IV, Holy Roman Emperor
Anna

Aldona died on 26 May 1339. Casimir remained a widower for two years.

Adelaide of Hesse
On 29 September 1341, Casimir married his second wife, Adelaide of Hesse. She was a daughter of Henry II, Landgrave of Hesse, and Elizabeth of Meissen. They had no children. Casimir started living separately from Adelaide soon after the marriage. Their loveless marriage lasted until 1356, when he declared himself divorced.

Christina Rokiczana
After Casimir "divorced" Adelaide he married his mistress Christina Rokiczana, the widow of Miklusz Rokiczani, a wealthy merchant. Her own origins are unknown. Following the death of her first husband she had entered the court of Bohemia in Prague as a lady-in-waiting. Casimir brought her with him from Prague and convinced the abbot of the Benedictine abbey of Tyniec to marry them. The marriage was held in a secret ceremony but soon became known. Queen Adelaide renounced it as bigamous and returned to Hesse. Casimir continued living with Christine despite complaints by Pope Innocent VI on behalf of Queen Adelaide. This marriage lasted until 1363–64 when Casimir again declared himself divorced. They had no children.

Hedwig of Żagań
In about 1365, Casimir married his fourth wife Hedwig of Żagań. She was a daughter of Henry V of Iron, Duke of Żagań and Anna of Mazovia. They had three children:
Anna of Poland, Countess of Celje (1366 – 9 June 1422); married firstly William of Celje; their only daughter was Anne of Celje, who married Jogaila of Lithuania when he was king of Poland (as Władysław II Jagiełło). Anna married secondly Ulrich, Duke of Teck; they had no children.
Kunigunde of Poland (1367 – 1370)
Jadwiga of Poland (1368 – ca. 1382)

As Adelheid was still alive (and possibly Christina as well), the marriage to Hedwig was also considered bigamous. Because of this, the legitimacy of his three young daughters was disputed. Casimir managed to have Anna and Kunigunde legitimated by Pope Urban V on 5 December 1369. Jadwiga the younger was legitimated by Pope Gregory XI on 11 October 1371 (after Casimir's death).

Title and style
Casimir's full title was: Casimir by the grace of God king of Poland and Rus' (Ruthenia), lord and heir of the land of Kraków, Sandomierz, Sieradz, Łęczyca, Kuyavia, Pomerania (Pomerelia). The title in Latin was: Kazimirus, Dei gratia rex Polonie et Russie, nec non Cracovie, Sandomirie, Siradie, Lancicie, Cuiavie, et Pomeranieque Terrarum et Ducatuum Dominus et Heres.

Popular culture

Film 

 Casimir III the Great is one of the main characters in Polish historical drama series Korona królów (The Crown of the Kings). He is played by Mateusz Król (season 1) and Andrzej Hausner (season 2).
Casimir III the Great is mentioned in a speech by Amon Göth in the film Schindler's List.

Video Games 

 Casimir features as a playable leader in the 2010 strategy game Civilization V, having been added in its 2013 expansion, Brave New World.
 Casimir also features as a ruler in the strategy game Crusader Kings II.

Currency 

 Casimir is featured on the obverse of the 50 Polish złoty banknote, with his regalia on the reverse.

Gallery

See also
History of Poland (966–1385)
Jagiellonian University
Kazimierz Wielki University in Bydgoszcz
Congress of Kraków
Kazimierz
Kazimierz Dolny
List of Poles
Esterka

Notes

References

Source

External links

His listing in "Medieval lands" by Charles Cawley. The project "involves extracting and analysing detailed information from primary sources, including contemporary chronicles, cartularies, necrologies and testaments."

 
 

 
 

 
1310 births
1370 deaths
14th-century Polish monarchs
Piast dynasty
Polish Roman Catholics
Burials at Wawel Cathedral